is a city located in Fukuoka Prefecture, Japan, on the island of Kyushu in southern Japan. Located near Kitakyūshū and Iizuka, Nōgata is in the center of the Chikuhō region of Fukuoka. The city was founded on January 1, 1931.

As of May 31, 2011, the city has an estimated population of 58,878, with 26,056 households and a population density of 953.03 persons per km². The total area is 61.78 km².

History
From the end of 19th century to the mid-20th century, Nōgata flourished as a center for mining coal. The Chikuhō region had the largest output of coal in Japan, but as the primary energy source changed from coal to oil, all coal mines were closed. Since then, Nōgata has suffered from a declining population.

The oldest recorded meteorite fall occurred at Nōgata on May 19 in the year of 861. (:ja:直方隕石)

Attractions and events

Nōgata Coal Memorial Museum
Nōgata's Coal Memorial Museum provides visitors with the history of coal mines in the area. Its exhibits include a steam locomotive, the machines for digging and extracting coal, coal miner's clothes, and other memorabilia. Closed Mondays. It is next to Taga Park.

Ongagawa Riverside Park
In spring, it features blooms of yellow flowers, and in April, a colorful Tulip Festival is held. About 200,000 people visit the festival for the period. The park is also a site where a fireworks show is held each year.

Art Museum
Closed Mondays.

Transport
The city has train services on the Chikuho Main Line operated by JR Kyushu and Heisei Chikuho Railway Ita Line. Trains stop at Nōgata Station. It is also the terminus of the Chikuho Electric Railroad Line. The Coto Coto Train touristic service stops here.

Famous people
Kaiō Hiroyuki, sumo wrestler
Kenji Yonekura, professional boxer

References

External links

 
 Nogata coal memorial museum 

 
Cities in Fukuoka Prefecture